MUSIC (MUltiple SIgnal Classification) is an algorithm used for frequency estimation and radio direction finding.

History 

In many practical signal processing problems, the objective is to estimate from measurements a set of constant parameters upon which the received signals depend. There have been several approaches to such problems including the so-called maximum likelihood (ML) method of Capon (1969) and Burg's maximum entropy (ME) method. Although often successful and widely used, these methods have certain fundamental limitations (especially bias and sensitivity in parameter estimates), largely because they use an incorrect model (e.g., AR rather than special ARMA) of the measurements. 

Pisarenko (1973) was one of the first to exploit the structure of the data model, doing so in the context of estimation of parameters of complex sinusoids in additive noise using a covariance approach. Schmidt (1977), while working at Northrop Grumman and independently Bienvenu and Kopp (1979) were the first to correctly exploit the measurement model in the case of sensor arrays of arbitrary form. Schmidt, in particular, accomplished this by first deriving a complete geometric solution in the absence of noise, then cleverly extending the geometric concepts to obtain a reasonable approximate solution in the presence of noise. The resulting algorithm was called MUSIC (MUltiple SIgnal Classification) and has been widely studied. 

In a detailed evaluation based on thousands of simulations, the Massachusetts Institute of Technology's Lincoln Laboratory concluded in 1998 that, among currently accepted high-resolution algorithms, MUSIC was the most promising and a leading candidate for further study and actual hardware implementation. However, although the performance advantages of MUSIC are substantial, they are achieved at a cost in computation (searching over parameter space) and storage (of array calibration data).

Theory 
MUSIC method assumes that a signal vector, consists of  complex exponentials, whose frequencies  are unknown, in the presence of Gaussian white noise, as given by the linear model

  

A crucial assumption is that number of sources, is less than the number of elements in the measurement vector, i.e. .

 

The autocorrelation matrix  is traditionally estimated using sample correlation matrix 

 

Since  is a Hermitian matrix, all of its  eigenvectors  are orthogonal to each other.

The general idea behind MUSIC method is to use all the eigenvectors that span the noise subspace to improve the performance of the Pisarenko estimator. 

Since any signal vector  that resides in the signal subspace  must be orthogonal to the noise subspace, it must be that  for all the eigenvectors  that spans the noise subspace.

 

where the matrix  is the matrix of eigenvectors that span the noise subspace . If , then  as implied by the orthogonality condition. Taking a reciprocal of the squared norm expression creates sharp peaks at the signal frequencies. The frequency estimation function for MUSIC (or the pseudo-spectrum) is

where  are the noise eigenvectors and

is the candidate steering vector. The locations of the  largest peaks of the estimation function give the frequency estimates for the  signal components

MUSIC is a generalization of Pisarenko's method, and it reduces to Pisarenko's method when .  In Pisarenko's method, only a single eigenvector is used to form the denominator of the frequency estimation function; and the eigenvector is interpreted as a set of autoregressive coefficients, whose zeros can be found analytically or with polynomial root finding algorithms.  In contrast, MUSIC assumes that several such functions have been added together, so zeros may not be present.  Instead there are local minima, which can be located by computationally searching the estimation function for peaks.

Dimension of signal space
The fundamental observation MUSIC and other subspace decomposition methods are based on is about the rank of the autocorrelation matrix  which is related to number of signal sources  as follows.

This fundamental result, although often skipped in spectral analysis books, is a reason why the input signal can be distributed into  signal subspace eigenvectors spanning  ( for real valued signals) and noise subspace eigenvectors spanning . It is based on signal embedding theory   and can also be explained by the topological theory of manifolds.

Comparison to other methods
MUSIC outperforms simple methods such as picking peaks of DFT spectra in the presence of noise, when the number of components is known in advance, because it exploits knowledge of this number to ignore the noise in its final report.

Unlike DFT, it is able to estimate frequencies with accuracy higher than one sample, because its estimation function can be evaluated for any frequency, not just those of DFT bins.  This is a form of superresolution.

Its chief disadvantage is that it requires the number of components to be known in advance, so the original method cannot be used in more general cases. Methods exist for estimating the number of source components purely from statistical properties of the autocorrelation matrix. See, e.g.  In addition, MUSIC assumes coexistent sources to be uncorrelated, which limits its practical applications. 

Recent iterative semi-parametric methods offer robust superresolution despite highly correlated sources, e.g., SAMV

Other applications 
A modified version of MUSIC, denoted as Time-Reversal MUSIC (TR-MUSIC) has been recently applied to computational time-reversal imaging. MUSIC algorithm has also been implemented for fast detection of the DTMF frequencies (Dual-tone multi-frequency signaling) in the form of C library - libmusic.

See also 
Spectral density estimation
Periodogram
Matched filter
Welch's method
Bartlett's method
SAMV (algorithm)
Radio direction finding
Pitch detection algorithm
High-resolution microscopy

References

Further reading
 The estimation and tracking of frequency, Quinn and Hannan, Cambridge University Press 2001.

Digital signal processing